Erased, known in Japan as Boku dake ga Inai Machi ("The Town Where Only I Am Missing"; abbr. , BokuMachi), is a Japanese manga series written and illustrated by Kei Sanbe. It was serialized in Kadokawa Shoten's Young Ace magazine from June 2012 to March 2016, and is licensed in English by Yen Press. An anime adaptation by A-1 Pictures aired on Fuji TV's Noitamina programming block from January to March 2016, and a live action film was released in March 2016. A live-action drama series was released by Netflix in December 2017.  A spin-off manga was published from June to November 2016 and the spin-off novel series by Hajime Ninomae was released in Kadokawa's Bungei Kadokawa magazine from November 2015 to March 2016.

Plot
In 2006, 29-year-old Satoru Fujinuma, a man living in Chiba, possesses an ability known as "Revival" that sends him back in time moments before a life-threatening incident, enabling him to prevent it from happening again. When his mother is murdered by an unknown assailant in his own home, Satoru's ability sends him back eighteen years into the past and Satoru is given the opportunity to not only save his mother, but also prevent a kidnapping incident that took the lives of three of his childhood friends.

Characters

Played by: Tatsuya Fujiwara (adult, film), Tsubasa Nakagawa (child, film), Yuki Furukawa (adult, drama), Reo Uchikawa (child, drama)
Satoru is a 29-year-old manga artist who also works part-time as a delivery man at Oasi Pizza. Many years ago while he was still a child, his father left him and his mother, for which reason he is living in a single parent home. He possesses an involuntary time-based ability he calls "Revival" which brings him back to a time before a life-threatening incident occurs and allows him to prevent it only by glimpsing a glowing bright blue butterfly, the appearance of which may symbolize the unpredictable effects the unique supernatural ability has not only on himself, but those around him. 

Played by: Rio Suzuki (film), Rinka Kakihara (drama)
Kayo is one of Satoru's primary school classmates and is one of the original victims of the serial kidnapping case that occurred 18 years ago.

Played by: Kasumi Arimura (film), Mio Yūki (drama)
Airi is a high school student and Satoru's friendly co-worker at Oasi Pizza. She becomes involved with him when she witnesses oddities such as when he manages to save people from certain life-threatening situations.

Played by: Yuriko Ishida (film); Tomoka Kurotani (drama)
Sachiko is Satoru's mother and a former news announcer. Her husband left the family many years ago, causing her to raise Satoru on her own. She possesses a sharp eye and is quick to observe any irregularities.

Played by Kento Hayashi (film); Masato Yano (drama)
Jun is a stuttering food delivery worker who lives in Satoru's hometown and often approaches lone students around his house. He and Satoru play with paper airplanes. Because he advises lonely children to be more "courageous" and make more friends, he is nicknamed "Yuuki", which means courage.

Played by Seiji Fukushi (film); Jin Shirasu (drama)
Kenya is one of Satoru's primary school classmates who has a strong sense of justice and is very mature for his age with his intelligent choices. He is an aspiring lawyer who has a keen eye.

Played by Shigeyuki Totsugi
Gaku is Satoru's homeroom teacher during his youth and the closest thing he has to a father figure.

Played by Kairi Jyo
Hiromi is one of Satoru's primary school classmates who appears feminine even though he is a boy. He is one of the original victims of the serial kidnapping case.

Osamu is one of Satoru's primary school classmates.

Kazu is one of Satoru's primary school classmates. He is much taller and heavier than the rest of Satoru's friends and goes out of his way to appear "masculine".

Aya is a student who attends Izumi Primary and is one of the original victims of the serial kidnapping case.

Misato is another classmate of Satoru's. She has a strong dislike for Kayo and she often likes to pick on her.

Played by Tamae Ando (film); Noriko Eguchi (drama)
Akemi is Kayo's abusive mother, whose abusive nature was exposed to the public.

Played by Miyu Ando
Kumi is a nine-year-old patient who suffers from leukemia.

Media

Manga
The original manga, written by Kei Sanbe, was serialized in Kadokawa Shoten's Young Ace magazine from the July 2012 issue (shipping date: June 4, 2012) through the April 2016 issue (shipping date: March 4, 2016). The first tankōbon volume was released in Japan on January 26, 2013, and the eighth volume was published on April 27, 2016. The series is licensed by Yen Press, who released the first volume in February 2017. The Yen Press hardcover editions combine two of the original volumes per book, while their ebook editions match the original volume numbering. The series is licensed in France by Ki-oon. Sanbe wrote a spin-off manga titled Erased: Re, which was serialized in Young Ace from June 4, 2016 to November 4, 2016. It was published as the ninth volume of the series in Japanese on February 4, 2017, and in English by  Yen Press on September 18, 2018.

Volumes

Anime
An anime television adaptation produced by A-1 Pictures aired on Fuji TV's Noitamina programming block from January 8 to March 25, 2016, and was simulcast on Crunchyroll, Daisuki, Funimation and AnimeLab. The series was directed by Tomohiko Itō and written by Taku Kishimoto, with character design by Keigo Sasaki.

The series is licensed in North America by Aniplex of America, in Australia by Madman Entertainment, and in the United Kingdom by Anime Limited. Aniplex of America announced that the series would receive an English dub in May 2016. The series was simulcast in certain countries in Southeast Asia with English subtitles on Aniplus Asia and is available to stream on Iflix in Malaysia, Thailand, the Philippines, Indonesia, Sri Lanka and Brunei with English subtitles.

Episode list

Live-action adaptations

A live-action film adaptation of Erased featuring Tatsuya Fujiwara as Satoru Fujinuma debuted in cinemas throughout Japan on March 19, 2016.

In March 2017, Netflix announced a live-action adaptation of the manga series, co-created with Kansai TV. The Netflix Original series was released worldwide on December 15, 2017. Unlike the anime and live-action film, the live-action web drama covers the manga fully and does not deviate from the source material. The drama stars Yuki Furukawa as 29-year-old Satoru Fujinuma, Reo Uchikawa as Satoru as a child, and Mio Yūki as Airi.

Novel
A spin-off novel titled Boku Dake ga Inai Machi: Another Record, written by Hajime Ninomae, was serialized in Kadokawa's monthly digital novel magazine Bungei Kadokawa from November 2015 to March 2016. A volume collecting the chapters was released on March 30, 2016.

Reception
Volume 4 reached the 12th place on the weekly Oricon manga chart and, as of June 15, 2014, has sold 73,983 copies.

The manga was ranked 16th in the 2014 Kono Manga ga Sugoi! Top 20 Manga for Male Readers survey. It was nominated for the 18th Tezuka Osamu Cultural Prize Reader Award. It was also nominated at the 7th Manga Taishō, receiving 82 points and placing 2nd among the ten nominees. It is nominated at the 8th Manga Taishō.

The staff at manga-news.com gave the French edition a grade of 17.33 out of 20. On Manga Sanctuary one of the staff members gave it an 8 out of 10.

See also
A Distant Neighborhood, a 1990s Japanese manga about an adult re-living his teenage life

References

External links
 

 
 
 
 

2012 manga
2016 anime television series debuts
A-1 Pictures
Anime and manga about time travel
Anime and manga set in Hokkaido
Anime composed by Yuki Kajiura
Anime series based on manga
Aniplex
Child abduction in fiction
Crime in anime and manga
Crunchyroll Anime Awards winners
Fiction about assassinations
Fiction about child murder
Fiction about suicide
Fiction set in 1988
Fiction set in 2003
Fiction set in 2005
Fiction set in 2006
Japanese-language Netflix original programming
Japanese time travel television series
Kadokawa Dwango franchises
Kadokawa Shoten manga
Kei Sanbe
Manga adapted into films
Mystery anime and manga
Noitamina
Seinen manga
Thriller anime and manga
Time loop anime and manga
Works about fictional serial killers
Yen Press titles